Thereus brocki is a species of butterfly of the family Lycaenidae. It found from eastern Colombia to eastern Peru. The habitat consists of wet forests up to about 1,000 meters elevation.

Etymology
The species is named for James Brock of Tucson, Arizona who collected the holotype.

References

Butterflies described in 2015
Thereus
Lycaenidae of South America